The 1960 United States Senate election in New Hampshire took place on November 8, 1960. Incumbent Republican Senator Styles Bridges won re-election to a fifth term in office, defeating Democrat Herbert Hill. Bridges died on November 26, 1961, less than one year after his term began.

Primary elections were held on September 13, 1960.

Republican primary

Candidates
Styles Bridges, incumbent Senator since 1937
Albert Levitt

Results

Democratic primary

Candidates
Herbert W. Hill
Alphonse Roy, former U.S. Representative from Manchester
Frank L. Sullivan

Results

General election

Candidates
Styles Bridges, incumbent Senator since 1937 (Republican)
Herbert W. Hill (Democratic)

Results

See also 
 1960 United States Senate elections

References

Bibliography
 

1960
New Hampshire
United States Senate